Face Dances is the ninth studio album by English rock band the Who. It is one of two Who studio albums with drummer Kenney Jones, who joined the band after Keith Moon's death three years earlier.

Despite mixed reviews from Rolling Stone and other critics, the album peaked at No. 4 on the US Billboard Top LPs & Tape chart and No. 2 on the UK Albums Chart.

Album cover
The album cover features 16 paintings of the band members by 16 British painters, who were commissioned by Peter Blake, designer of the cover of the Beatles' album Sgt. Pepper's Lonely Hearts Club Band (1967). Artists include Tom Phillips, Richard Hamilton, Allen Jones, David Hockney, Clive Barker, R. B. Kitaj, Howard Hodgkin, Patrick Caulfield, David Inshaw, Mike Andrews, Joe Tilson, Patrick Procktor, David Tindle and Blake himself.<ref>{{Cite web|url=https://www.tate.org.uk/art/artworks/blake-illustration-to-the-cover-of-face-dances-p11031|title='Illustration to the cover of 'Face Dances, Peter Blake, 1981}}</ref>

Photographer Gavin Cochrane took a reference photo of each of the four members of the band (Pete Townshend, Roger Daltrey, John Entwistle and Kenney Jones) which the 16 artists used to paint on  canvases the portraits of each member of the band for the front cover of Face Dances. 

R. B. Kitaj did a charcoal portrait on Ingres paper of John Entwistle. Kitaj (1932-2007) was a Jewish American from Chagrin Falls, Ohio but made his home in England for many years and was elected to the Royal Academy in 1991 – the first American to do so since John Singer Sargent in the 1890s.

David Inshaw painted a portrait of Roger Daltrey which features on the cover of Face Dances. David Inshaw was a member of the Brotherhood of Ruralists along with Peter Blake and Jann Howarth and Graham and Annie Ovenden in the 1970s. In 1973, his painting 'The Badminton Game' was exhibited at the ICA Summer Exhibition and was subsequently acquired by the Tate.

Richard Hamilton did a portrait of Pete Townshend for the cover of Face Dances. Hamilton was one of the first British Pop artists, known for his painting and collage work. Hamilton was the cover designer of The Beatles' self-titled 1968 album and its poster insert, and for his painting 'Swingeing London 67 (f)' which depicted Mick Jagger and art dealer Robert Fraser in handcuffs following their arrest on drug charges.

Release
In 1993, Polydor re-released the album on CD. It only held the songs from the original LP.

In 1997, the album was remixed, remastered and re-released by MCA with three outtakes as well as two live tracks. The live track "How Can You Do It Alone" is an edited version of the live performance.

"You Better You Bet" was the first single released from the album; its music video was one of the first music videos aired on MTV in 1981, and was the first to be repeated on the channel. "Don't Let Go the Coat" was the second single to be released from the album, and it also had its own music video. While a video was shot for "Another Tricky Day" it was not released as a single commercially but it was a US Album Rock Top 10 track.Face Dances celebrated its 40th anniversary with the release on 12 June 2021 on Record Store Day 1 of a 2-LP expanded coloured vinyl version (LP1 is blue and LP2 is yellow). Both discs have been mastered by Jon Astley at Close To The Edge and cut at half speed by Miles Showell at the Abbey Road Studios.  The pressing was limited to 6500 copies. LP1 is the newly re-mastered version of the album, while LP2 has a side of studio out-takes and four live tracks from the band's 1981 Rockpalast show which appear for the first time on vinyl.

Live performances
Every song on this album, with the exception of "Daily Records", has been performed live by either the Who or one of its members' outside bands.

On the band's 1981 tour supporting the album, five songs were performed live: "You Better You Bet", "Don't Let Go the Coat", "The Quiet One", "Did You Steal My Money", and "Another Tricky Day". However, only "You Better You Bet", "The Quiet One" and "Another Tricky Day" were played after the tour.

"You Better You Bet" is one of the band's more famous live songs, being played in almost every tour following 1981, namely 1989, 1999, 2000, 2002, 2004, 2006, 2007, 2008, 2009, 2013, 2014-2016, 2019, and 2022. Live performances of this song did not differ much from the studio arrangement, save for the guitar solo, which was usually played differently.

"Don't Let Go The Coat" was played in every concert of the 1981 tour but did not last past it.

"The Quiet One" was written by Entwistle to replace "My Wife" on stage, and it did for the years of 1981 and 1982. However, in the later tours, it was not played again and "My Wife" was brought back.

"Did You Steal My Money" was only played four times on the 1981 tour, three of those times as an encore, and usually leading into another song.

"How Can You Do It Alone" was first performed live much earlier than the release date of the album. In fact, all of its live performances came before its release. In 1979, Townshend introduced this song with a different, faster arrangement with different lyrics during the encores of the US/Canada leg of the tour. It was played once more in 1980. A version more similar to the studio version (though still quite different) was played at a concert at the Cornwall Coliseum in St Austell on 30 January 1981. By that time, the lyrics had been more or less set in stone. However, it was never played again after that concert.

"Another Tricky Day" was also performed live first before 1981. Townshend introduced some lyrics of the song during a jam of "Dance It Away" in Los Angeles on the 1980 tour. 1981 performances of this song featured a lengthy jam at its conclusion, and these versions could reach as long as eight minutes. In 2002, this song was brought back for the North American tour as a tribute to Entwistle, who died right before the start of the tour. The song was played a few more times in 2004 as well, and was brought back for the second leg of the Hits Back! tour in 2022.

"Cache Cache" and "You" were never performed live by The Who, but Daltrey performed the former once on his 2009 Use It or Lose It tour'', while the John Entwistle Band sometimes played the latter during their concerts.

Track listing

Personnel
The Who
 Roger Daltrey – lead vocals
 Pete Townshend – guitar, keyboards, backing vocals, lead vocals on "I Like Nightmares", "Somebody Saved Me" and "How Can You Do It Alone"
 John Entwistle – bass, backing vocals, lead vocals on "The Quiet One"
 Kenney Jones – drums

Additional musicians
 John "Rabbit" Bundrick – keyboards

Production
 Allan Blazek – engineering
 Chris Charlesworth – executive producer
 Bill Curbishley – executive producer
 Greg Fulginiti – mastering
 Ted Jensen at Sterling Sound, NYC – mastering
 Bob Ludwig – remastering
 Jimmy Patterson – assistant engineering
 Teri Reed – assistant engineering
 Robert Rosenberg – executive producer
 Bill Szymczyk – production, engineering
 Jon Walls – AIR Studios, recording engineer

Artwork and design
 Michael Andrews – paintings
 Brian Aris – photography
 Clive Barker – paintings, photography, paintbox bronze on rear cover
 Peter Blake – album cover design, concept, paintings
 Patrick Caulfield – paintings
 Gavin Cochrane – photography
 Richard Evans – graphic design and cassette cover design
 Richard Hamilton – paintings
 David Hockney – paintings
 Howard Hodgkin – paintings
 David Inshaw – paintings
 Bill Jacklin – paintings
 Allen Jones – paintings
 R. B. Kitaj – paintings
 Tom Phillips – paintings
 Patrick Procktor – paintings
 Colin Self – paintings
 Joe Tilson – paintings
 David Tindle – paintings

In the order they are presented on the sleeve (left to right, top to bottom), the pictures are painted by:

Pete Townshend: Bill Jacklin, Tom Phillips, Colin Self and Richard Hamilton
Roger Daltrey: Michael Andrews, Allen Jones, David Inshaw and David Hockney
John Entwistle: Clive Barker, R. B. Kitaj, Howard Hodgkin and Patrick Caulfield
Kenney Jones: Peter Blake, Joe Tilson, Patrick Procktor and David Tindle

Charts

Certifications

References

External links
 www.thewho.net. Face Dances Liner Notes. Retrieved 13 February 2005.
 

1981 albums
Albums produced by Bill Szymczyk
MCA Records albums
Polydor Records albums
The Who albums
Warner Records albums
Albums with cover art by Peter Blake (artist)